Richard Paige may refer to:
Richard Paige, penname used by writer Dean Koontz
Richard G. L. Paige (1846–1904), member of the Virginia House of Delegates